Ivan Šapina (born 17 November 1999) is a Croatian taekwondo practitioner. He won one of the bronze medals in the men's middleweight event at the 2019 World Taekwondo Championships held in Manchester, United Kingdom.

In 2021, he won one of the bronze medals in the men's 87 kg event at the European Taekwondo Championships held in Sofia, Bulgaria.

He represented Croatia at the 2020 Summer Olympics held in Tokyo, Japan. He competed in the men's +80 kg event where he was eliminated in his second match by Sun Hongyi of China.

He won the gold medal in the men's +80 kg event at the 2022 Mediterranean Games held in Oran, Algeria.

References

External links
 

Living people
1999 births
Place of birth missing (living people)
Croatian male taekwondo practitioners
European Taekwondo Championships medalists
Taekwondo practitioners at the 2020 Summer Olympics
Olympic taekwondo practitioners of Croatia
Competitors at the 2022 Mediterranean Games
Mediterranean Games gold medalists for Croatia
Mediterranean Games medalists in taekwondo
21st-century Croatian people